Umbo may refer to:

Anatomy
 Umbo (eye), tiny depression in the center of the foveola corresponding to the foveal reflex
 Umbo of tympanic membrane, the central, most inverted portion of the eardrum

Flora and fauna
 Umbo (bivalve), part of a bivalve shell which was formed when the animal was a juvenile
 Umbo (conifer cone), the first year's growth of a seed scale on a conifer cone, showing up as a protuberance at the end of the two-year-old scale
 Umbo (mycology), at the top of some mushrooms

Other
 Otto Umbehr (1902–1980), a German photographer known as "Umbo"
 A shield boss, a round, convex, or conical piece of material at the center of a shield
 An online therapy company based in Australia umbo